World Series Baseball '95 is a traditional baseball simulation video game by Sega.  It was released in 1995 for the Game Gear and Sega Genesis, as well as a 32X version sold as World Series Baseball starring Deion Sanders.  In Japan, the game features Hideo Nomo on the cover and is called Nomo's World Series Baseball in English and Nomo Hideo no World Series Baseball in Japanese.

Gameplay
The game allows players to put teams involved in the 1994 Major League Baseball season in either exhibition, regular season, or playoff mode.

This video game also permits the player to create two customized teams with their choice of their favorite players (no luxury taxes unlike the modern baseball games). At the conclusion of the regular season there are awards given out for MVP, along with the Cy Young Award, the Triple Crown, amongst other awards that are dependent on regular season statistics. Also, players are selected to the All-Star Game purely based on statistics from the first half of the regular season. Unlocking a code allows a fictional team in exhibition mode. The players are asked how many innings they want to play and if they need a designated hitter prior to starting the game among other options like an optional digitized voice (for all the umpire's decisions) and the way that the game is viewed (front or back).

Reception
World Series Baseball '95 was met with critical acclaim. Quick-Draw McGraw of GamePro applauded the Game Gear version for having "a ton of options that're usually seen only on 16-bit systems." He criticized the music and the limited vocabulary of the digitized voice, but nonetheless decreed it "one of the premiere sports games on the Game Gear." Writing for the same publication, Bacon was similarly enthusiastic about the Genesis version, citing the added modes and improved graphics over the original World Series Baseball. Electronic Gaming Monthly also gave the Genesis version a rave review, commenting that "The best baseball game of all time has been made better." Both their sports reviewers gave it a 9 out of 10. A reviewer for Next Generation similarly said that "The first WSB was the best baseball game of '94 and the '95 version looks even better." Particularly praising the comprehensive modes and content and the new multiplayer leagues, he gave it four out of five stars.

For the 32X version, Next Generation reviewed the 32X version of the game, rating it five stars out of five, and stated, "World Series '95 for the 32X isn't much better than its 16-bit counterpart, but it's easily the best baseball game available. This one won't disappoint."  GamePro, however, criticized the release as being minimally improving over the Genesis version.

See also 

 World Series Baseball '96

References

1994 video games
Game Gear games
Sega Genesis games
World Series Baseball video games
Multiplayer and single-player video games
Video games developed in the United States
Video games scored by Sam Powell